Paracymbites is an extinct genus of lower Jurassic ammonite that lived during Raricostatum zone of upper Sinemurian. Animals belonging to this genus had small shells with semicircular whorl section and rounded or fastigate venter, of which umbilicus made about 25% of diameter. Last whorl could have been excentric. Keel was faint and it might have been only on the earlier part of the last whorl. Aperture had ventral rostrum. Body chamber made about 75% of whorl and was faintly plicate, or smooth.

Distribution
Fossils belonging to this genus were found in Great Britain, Tunisia and Morocco.

References

Oxynoticeratidae
Ammonitida genera
Jurassic ammonites of Europe
Ammonites of Africa
Sinemurian life